Tadeusz Zbigniew Kusy, O.F.M. (born 2 December 1951) is a Polish Franciscan missionary and bishop of Kaga-Bandoro in the Central African Republic.

Life 
Born in Cieszyn, Kusy became a member of the Franciscan Order in Katowice in 1968. He made his perpetual vows in 1974, and was ordained to the priesthood on April 15, 1976. After working in parish in Katowice Panewniki, he became a missionary in Zaire in 1979. In the years 1986-1989 he studied at the Institute of Science and Theology of Religions in Paris, France. He returned to Central African Republic in Africa in 1986. Father Kusy was an educator of young brothers in Bimbo in the Archdiocese of Bangui. He chaired the commission for the consecrated life, and was a member of the Archbishop's college of consultors.

On 31 May 2014, Pope Francis appointed him bishop coadjutor of Kaga-Bandoro. Father Kusy received his episcopal consecration on the following August 15 from Dieudonné Nzapalainga, Archbishop of Bangui, with bishop of Kaga-Bandoro, Albert Vanbuel, and bishop emeritus of Kole in Democratic Republic of the Congo, Stanislas Lukumwena Lumbala, serving as co-consecrators. On 27 September 2015 was named bishop of the Roman Catholic Diocese of Kaga-Bandoro.

His motto is "Tecum et tibi, Jesu!".

References

External links
 Catholic Hierarchy

1951 births
Living people
People from Cieszyn
Roman Catholic missionaries in the Central African Republic
Polish Roman Catholic priests
21st-century Roman Catholic bishops in the Central African Republic
Polish expatriates in the Central African Republic
Franciscan missionaries
Franciscan bishops
Roman Catholic bishops of Kaga-Bandoro